Life School is a charter school operator headquartered in Red Oak, Texas. Life School was chartered in the state of Texas in 1998 and has campuses in Dallas-Fort Worth, Cedar Hill, Carrollton, Lancaster, Oak Cliff,  Red Oak, Waxahachie, and West Dallas. It operates with a private school atmosphere and adheres to public school education requirements mandated by the state.

Life School has been recognized by the state of Texas on numerous occasions for its allocation of resources, earning a five star rating from the Texas Comptroller's Office. It is also the first charter school in the state of Texas to access the Permanent School Fund, allowing its school bonds used for funding to be guaranteed by the state of Texas.

History

Life School was founded by Dr. Tom Wilson in 1989. Prior to that time, Wilson was employed in the educational system since 1966, serving as a pastor, speaker, and director of private schools. Wilson began Life School in Dallas as a conduit to train adults who were unemployed and had no employable skills, while at the same time offering activities for youth and children.  Wilson reorganized the school's objective after finding a low success rate regarding people whose lifestyles changed permanently. During the 1990s, Wilson worked to make Life School a free tuition school. This was in response to the gang activities in the Dallas area that made the city the murder capital (per capita) of the United States. Wilson's goal was to teach and train children before they became involved in gang activities.

Life School filed a charter school application with the Texas Education Agency in 1997. The application was completed by Wilson along with other community leaders that included educational lawyers and other educators. In March 1998 the school was granted the charter and began open enrollment as a free tuition public school in August that same year. The school became popular in the communities it served and parents camped out overnight to enroll their children. The first Life School campus to open was in Oak Cliff, Texas in Dallas County.

Life School became the first charter school in Texas to access Permanent School Funding. This took place in 2014 after the Texas State Board of Education expanded such funding to include charter schools. It eliminated its high rate of financing with the Permanent Education Fund now guaranteeing its bonds. Life School sold approximately $100 million in tax-exempt and taxable bonds to refund debt and build a new high school, which it broke ground for in 2014. Located in Waxahachie, Texas, the school is 125,000 square feet and has educational facilities that include science labs, computer labs, athletic practice fields and extracurricular activities. The high school campus is also Life School's seventh campus, with the school saving approximately $13 million through its first bond sale guaranteed by the Permanent School Fund.

Education and campuses
Life School operates educational facilities in Dallas-Fort Worth (K-12), Cedar Hill (K-6), Carrollton (K-5), Lancaster (K-6), Red Oak (K-6), Mountain Creek (K-6) and Waxahachie (K-12). Life School is a tuition-free, public school following required curriculum and administering state-mandated tests that include the Texas Assessment of Knowledge and Skills. The graduation rate for Life School was reported as 99.5% from 2004 to 2014, with 79% of graduates attending post high school within two years of graduation.

The school also provides a $1,000 college scholarship named for founder Dr. Tom Wilson, awarded to the valedictorians of each graduating class. Life School offers organized athletics at various campus. Some sport activities include basketball, football, track and field, and cheerleading.

Campus locations

Oak Cliff Elementary - (Oak Cliff, Dallas) - Kindergarten through 6th grade
Oak Cliff Middle - (Oak Cliff) - 7th grade through 8th grade
Oak Cliff Secondary - (Oak Cliff) - 9th grade through 12th grade
Red Oak - (Red Oak) - Kindergarten through 6th grade
Waxahachie Middle School - (Waxahachie) - 7th grade and 8th grade
Waxahachie High School - (Waxahachie) - 9th grade through 12th Grade
Lancaster Elementary - (Lancaster) - Kindergarten through 6th grades
Cedar Hill Elementary - (Cedar Hill) - Kindergarten through 6th grade
Mountain Creek Elementary - (Oak Cliff) — Kindergarten through 6th grade
Carrollton Elementary - (Carrollton) — Kindergarten through 5th grade

Awards and recognition

Life School was recognized by the Comptroller's office in 2012, being named to the Texas Honors Circle for excellence in resource allocations. It earned the same distinction in 2013 and 2014 by receiving a five star rating, the highest rating given by the Texas Comptroller. It was one of only 45 districts and 13 charter schools to receive the distinction. The same year it was awarded the highest rating of superior achievement by the Texas Education Agency. Life School Oak Cliff was rated a Bronze award as one of the best high schools by U.S. News & World Report in 2014.

References

External links

 Life School official website
 Life School Peak official blog

Education in Dallas
Public education in Texas
Educational institutions established in 1998
1998 establishments in Texas